Tubuaia fosbergi is a species of air-breathing land snail or semislug, a terrestrial pulmonate gastropod mollusk in the family Helicarionidae. This species is endemic to the Pitcairn Islands.

References

F
Fauna of the Pitcairn Islands
Molluscs of Oceania
Vulnerable fauna of Oceania
Gastropods described in 1962
Taxonomy articles created by Polbot